Kasper Andersen (born 1 July 2002) is a Danish professional road cyclist, who currently rides for UCI Continental team  and as a stagiaire for UCI WorldTeam .

Major results
2019
 9th Overall Saarland Trofeo
2020
 1st  Road race, UEC European Junior Road Championships
 9th Overall Grand Prix Rüebliland
2021
 3rd Fyen Rundt
2022
 10th Overall International Tour of Rhodes

References

External links

2002 births
Living people
Danish male cyclists